This is a list of musical genres organized according to the eras of Classical music. The form of a musical composition refers to the general outline of the composition, based on the sections that comprise it or on specific details that are unique to a certain type of composition. For example, a rondo is based on alternation between familiar and novel sections (ABACA); a mazurka is defined by its meter and rhythm; a nocturne is based on the mood it creates, required to be inspired by or evocative of night. This list summarizes these broadly defined forms and genres within the musical periods that they arose or became common.

Medieval
 Ballade
 Ballata
 Canso
 Conductus
 Estampie
 Geisslerlied
 Gregorian Chant
 Lai (poetic form)
 Lauda (song)
 Madrigal (Trecento)
 Motet
 Organum
 Planctus
 Saltarello

Renaissance
 Ballade
 Canzona
 Carol
 Chanson
 Fantasia
 Chromatic fantasia
 Galliard
 Intermedio
 Lauda
 Litany
 Madrigal
 Madrigal comedy
 Madrigale spirituale
 Mass
 Cyclic mass
 Parody mass
 Paraphrase mass
 Cantus firmus mass
 Motet
 Motet-chanson
 Opera
 Pavane
 Ricercar
 Sequence
 Tiento
 Toccata

Baroque
 Allemande
 Bourrée
 Canary
 Canon
 Cantata
 Chaconne
 Concerto
 Concerto grosso
 Solo concerto
 Courante
 Fugue
 Galliard
 Gavotte
 Gigue
 Loure
 Mass
 Minuet
 Opera
 Opera buffa
 Opera seria
 Oratorio
 Partita
 Passacaglia
 Passepied
 Pastorale
 Prelude
 Rigaudon
 Sarabande
 Sinfonia
 Sonata
 Flute sonata
 Trio sonata
 Suite
 Sonatina

Classical + Romantic
 Arabesque
 Bagatelle
 Ballade
 Ballet
 Classical ballet
 Caprice
 Carol
 Concerto
 Cello concerto
 Clarinet concerto
 Double bass concerto
 Flute concerto
 Oboe concerto
 Piano concerto
 Trumpet concerto
 Viola concerto
 Violin concerto
Dance
Divertimento
Étude
Fantasy
 Impromptu
 Intermezzo
 Lied
 Mass
 March
 Mazurka
 Music hall
 Nocturne
 Octet
 Opera
 Ballad opera
 Opera buffa
 Opéra comique
 Opera seria
 Operetta
 Overture
 Concert overture
 Symphonic poem
 Singspiel
 Zarzuela
 Concert Aria
 Oratorio
 Polonaise
 Prelude
 Quartet
 Piano quartet
 String quartet
 Oboe quartet
 Quintet
 Piano quintet
 String quintet
 Wind Quintet
 Requiem
 Rhapsody
 Rondo
 Scherzo
 Serenade
 Sinfonia concertante
 Sonata
 Bassoon sonata
 Cello sonata
 Clarinet sonata
 Flute sonata
 Piano sonata
 Violin sonata
 Viola sonata
 Song cycle
 Symphony
 Program symphony
 Choral symphony
 Suite
 Waltz

20th and 21st Century
 Ballet
 Neoclassical ballet
 Contemporary ballet
 Burlesque
 Cabaret
 Concerto for Orchestra
 Electronic music
 Experimental music theatre
 Film score
 Moment form
 Minimal music
 Musical theatre
 Opera
 Soundtrack
 Trio
 Vaudeville

 
 

Classical music styles
Classical